Tiruvadanai taluk is a taluk of Ramanathapuram district of the Indian state of Tamil Nadu. The headquarters of the taluk is the town of Tiruvadanai.[uppor post]]kadaloor]

Demographics
According to the 2011 census, the taluk of Tiruvadanai had a population of 181,591 with 92,039  males and 89,552 females. There were 973 women for every 1000 men. The taluk had a literacy rate of 68.14. Child population in the age group below 6 was 8,924 Males and 8,942 Females.

Divisions 
As of 2011, Tiruvadanai taluk administered forty-seven panchayat villages.

References 

Taluks of Ramanathapuram district